Geert Omloop (born 12 February 1974) is a Belgian former professional road racing cyclist who was born in Herentals. He is the cousin of fellow cyclist Wim Omloop and the son of Marcel Omloop. He turned professional in 1997 having raced for several professional teams in 1995 and 1996 as a trainee. He became the Belgian National Road Race Champion in 2003, but lost the title in 2004 when he finished second.

Major results

1995
 1st Stage 5 Tour de la province d'Anvers
 8th Nationale Sluitingprijs
1996
 1st Grote Prijs Stad Geel
 5th Schaal Sels
1997
 2nd Nationale Sluitingprijs
 5th De Kustpijl
1999
 1st Omloop van het Waasland
 1st Omloop van de Vlaamse Scheldeboorden
 2nd Omloop van de Westhoek
 3rd GP Stad Vilvoorde
 8th GP Stad Zottegem
2000
 2nd Omloop van de Westhoek
 2nd Zomergem–Adinkerke
 3rd Grote 1-MeiPrijs
 4th Overall Guldensporentweedaagse
 4th Ronde van Midden-Zeeland
 4th Kampioenschap van Vlaanderen
 5th GP Stad Zottegem
 7th GP Rudy Dhaenens
 9th Le Samyn
2001
 1st GP Rudy Dhaenens
 1st Omloop van het Houtland
 1st Grote 1-MeiPrijs
 2nd GP Rik Van Steenbergen
 2nd Delta Profronde
 2nd Tour Beneden-Maas
 3rd Grote Prijs Jef Scherens
 5th Kampioenschap van Vlaanderen
 8th Le Samyn
2002
 1st Nationale Sluitingprijs
 2nd ZLM Tour
 2nd Henk Vos Memorial
 3rd Tour de Vendée
 3rd Grote 1-MeiPrijs
 4th Vlaamse Havenpijl
 7th Ronde van Midden-Zeeland
 9th GP Stad Zottegem
2003
 1st  Road race, National Road Championships
 1st Omloop van het Houtland
 1st GP Stad Zottegem
 1st Omloop van het Waasland
 2nd Ronde van Midden-Zeeland
 2nd Rund um den Flughafen Köln-Bonn
 3rd Dwars door Gendringen
 4th Brussels–Ingooigem
 5th Omloop van de Vlaamse Scheldeboorden
 5th Grote 1-MeiPrijs
 6th Kampioenschap van Vlaanderen
 8th Nationale Sluitingprijs
 8th Kuurne–Brussels–Kuurne
 9th Druivenkoers-Overijse
 10th Schaal Sels
2004
 1st GP Rudy Dhaenens
 2nd Road race, National Road Championships
 2nd GP de Villers-Cotterêts
 5th Kuurne–Brussels–Kuurne
 8th Overall Driedaagse van West-Vlaanderen
2005
 1st Omloop Mandel-Leie-Schelde
 2nd Schaal Sels
 3rd Nokere Koerse
 8th Memorial Rik Van Steenbergen
 8th Tour de Rijke
 9th Ronde van Noord-Holland
 10th Flèche Hesbignonne
2006
 4th De Drie Zustersteden
 5th Overall Tour de Picardie
 10th Nationale Sluitingprijs
2007
 1st Gullegem Koerse
 1st Grote Prijs Marcel Kint
 1st Grote Prijs Beeckman-De Caluwé
 2nd Omloop van het Waasland
 4th Nationale Sluitingprijs
 4th Grand Prix de Beuvry-la-Forêt
 4th Internatie Reningelst
 4th Omloop der Kempen
 4th Classic Loire Atlantique
 4th GP Briek Schotte
 6th Nokere Koerse
 9th Ronde van Drenthe
2008
 1st Heistse Pijl
 8th GP Briek Schotte
 10th Ronde van Drenthe
2009
 1st Ronde van het Groene Hart
 1st Dwars door het Hageland
 2nd Rund um Düren
 9th Le Samyn
2010
 2nd Ronde van Noord-Holland
 6th Ronde van het Groene Hart

References

Belgian male cyclists
Living people
1974 births
People from Herentals
Cyclists from Antwerp Province